The Egyptian Center for Economic and Social Rights (ECESR) is an Egyptian non-governmental legal and research organization which addresses issues of Egyptian and Arabic human rights.

Outreach 
The ECESR sometimes coordinates with other NGOs to address human rights issues. In a report titled 'Above the State' the ECESR suggested that increased foreign investment may not lead to improved conditions for most Egyptians.

Police raids 
ECESR offices have been subjected to multiple raids by Egyptian police leading to protest from numerous other agencies.

2019 Egyptian protests
ECESR became well known during the 2019 Egyptian protests for its detailed documentation of arrests of protestors and random passers-by. On 26 September 2019, five days after protests started, ECESR listed 1909 arrests related to the protests.

See also 
 Khaled Ali
 Hisham Mubarak Law Center
 Mohammed Adel (youth leader)

References

External links 
 ECESR homepage (English, official)
 Consultation: The Human Rights Impact of Fiscal and Tax Policy, an ECESR submission to the United Nations Special Rapporteur on Extreme Poverty and Human Rights.

Human rights organisations based in Egypt
Civil rights organizations
Think tanks based in Egypt